The 1933 Volta a Catalunya was the 15th edition of the Volta a Catalunya cycle race and was held from 10 June to 18 June 1933. The race started and finished in Barcelona. The race was won by Alfredo Bovet.

Route and stages

General classification

References

1933
Volta
1933 in Spanish road cycling
June 1933 sports events